Ruth Alcock may refer to:
Ruth Alcock, character in The Lakes (TV series)
Ruth Follows, maiden name Alcock